Dunkirk is a city in Blackford and Jay counties in the U.S. state of Indiana. The population was 2,164 at the 2020 census.

Geography
Dunkirk is located at  (40.37, -85.21) and is primarily in Jay County, though the northwestern portion of the town (west of Main Street and north of Blackford Avenue) lies in neighboring Blackford County.  The southwestern portion of town also abuts Delaware County.

Dunkirk has a typical Midwestern humid continental seasonal climate.  There are four distinct seasons, with winters being cold with moderate snowfall, while summers can be warm and humid. The highest average temperature is in July at 84 °F (29 °C), while the lowest average temperature is in January at 15 °F (−9.0 °C). However, summer temperatures can top 90 °F (32 °C), and winter temperatures can drop below 0 °F (−17 °C). Average monthly precipitation ranges from about 2 to 4 inches (5 to 10 cm), with the heaviest occurring during May, June, and July. The highest recorded temperature was 110.0 °F (43.3 °C) on July 14, 1936, and the lowest recorded temperature was −40.0 °F (−31.7 °C) on January 21, 1985.

History

Dunkirk was originally called Quincy, and under the latter name was platted in 1853. When the first post office was established there, it was discovered there was already a Quincy, Indiana, and so the town was renamed Dunkirk to avoid repetition.

The Dunkirk Post Office contains a mural, Preparations for Autumn Festival, Dunkirk, painted in 1941 by Frances Foy. Murals were produced from 1934 to 1943 in the United States through the Section of Painting and Sculpture, later called the Section of Fine Arts, of the Treasury Department.

Dunkirk, referred as the Glass Capitol of Indiana, was once home to 23 glass factories, some no larger than a house. With the closure of Indiana Glass Company, only one glass factory remains. It produces approximately 2,500,000 beer bottles per day for Budweiser. The factory is an ultra computerized modern facility employing 400 employees. Dunkirk also houses an extensive Glass Museum with glass manufactured worldwide. An annual Feel The Warmth downtown city event and a Mainstreet USA Festival. It also has a large 4 July Fireworks Display and Annual Event held at the large City Park.

Dunkirk is also home to one of the largest city parks in Jay County as well as a downtown Depot Park with Summer Concerts and Weekend Farmer Markets. The large Municipal provides 2 baseball fields, 1 large enclosed shelter house and a small open shelter building, various children related playground equipment, a basketball court, a large modern community center and a community swimming pool.

Demographics

2010 census
As of the census of 2010, there were 2,362 people, 960 households, and 619 families living in the city. The racial makeup of the city was 98.6% White, 0.3% African American, 0.1% Native American, 0.4% from other races, and 0.6% from two or more races. Hispanic or Latino of any race were 1.2% of the population.

There were 960 households, of which 32.0% had children under the age of 18 living with them, 42.6% were married couples living together, 15.4% had a female householder with no husband present, 6.5% had a male householder with no wife present, and 35.5% were non-families. 31.1% of all households were made up of individuals, and 12.4% had someone living alone who was 65 years of age or older. The average household size was 2.46 and the average family size was 3.03.

The median age in the city was 37.2 years. 26.3% of residents were under the age of 18; 8.9% were between the ages of 18 and 24; 24.9% were from 25 to 44; 25.6% were from 45 to 64; and 14.2% were 65 years of age or older. The gender makeup of the city was 48.6% male and 51.4% female.

2000 census
As of the census of 2000, there were 2,646 people, 1,093 households, and 746 families living in the city. The racial makeup of the city was 98.34% White, 0.30% African American, 0.15% Native American, 0.26% Asian, 0.08% Pacific Islander, 0.11% from other races, and 0.76% from two or more races. Hispanic or Latino of any race were 0.64% of the population.

There were 1,093 households, out of which 30.9% had children under the age of 18 living with them, 51.9% were married couples living together, 12.3% had a female householder with no husband present, and 31.7% were non-families. 27.5% of all households were made up of individuals, and 15.3% had someone living alone who was 65 years of age or older. The average household size was 2.42 and the average family size was 2.91.

In the city the population was spread out, with 24.6% under the age of 18, 9.2% from 18 to 24, 26.6% from 25 to 44, 23.7% from 45 to 64, and 15.9% who were 65 years of age or older. The median age was 38 years. For every 100 females, there were 92.0 males. For every 100 females age 18 and over, there were 85.3 males.

The median income for a household in the city was $33,750, and the median income for a family was $38,220. Males had a median income of $32,684 versus $20,517 for females. The per capita income for the city was $15,128. About 7.1% of families and 10.5% of the population were below the poverty line, including 10.7% of those under age 18 and 9.8% of those age 65 or over.

Education
The town has a lending library, the Dunkirk Public Library.
The town also has an Elementary School, Westlawn Elementary and a Middle school, West Jay Middle School (slated to be closed in 2020 and middle school students sent to the High School). They are both located in the city limits and are a part of Jay County School Corporation.

References

External links 

 City of Dunkirk website
 The Glass Museum (in Dunkirk)

Cities in Blackford County, Indiana
Cities in Jay County, Indiana
Cities in Indiana
1853 establishments in Indiana
Populated places established in 1853